The European Boys' Team Championship (Jean-Louis Dupont Trophy) is a European amateur team golf championship for men up to 18 organized by the European Golf Association. The inaugural event was held in 1980 and it has been played annually since.

Since the European Youths' Team Championship, for men under 22, was discontinued in 2006, due to the trend of players reaching elite level at an earlier age, the European Boys' Team Championship has been regarded as the most important junior team event in Europe outside the British Isles. Many European players on the world's leading professional golf tours have played in the event during their early careers. This include (as of end of 2022) almost every European winner of professional major championships since 2010; Graeme McDowell, Justin Rose, Martin Kaymer, Sergio Garcia, Rory McIlroy, Henrik Stenson, Danny Willett, Francesco Molinari, Jon Rahm, Shane Lowry and Matt Fitzpatrick.    

The championship is a counting event for the Junior Ryder Cup qualification.

Format
The format consists of 16 nation teams, each of 6 players, competing in two rounds of stroke play, out of which the five lowest scores from each team's six players will count each day. The total addition of the five lowest scores will constitute the team's score and determine which team is qualified for the last three rounds of match play.

Only teams in contention for a medal will play a match format of two foursomes and five singles, while the other teams will play a one foursome and four singles match format.

Initially there were four players in each team and from 1982 until 1984 there were five players in each team. The number of participating teams has been restricted to 20 from 2004 and to 16 from 2012 and a second division tournament was introduced, making it possible for nations to qualify for the first division championship. The 2021 event took place in a reduced format, with eleven teams playing, due to the COVID-19 pandemic, why 18 teams were allowed to compete in 2022.

Results

Winning nations' summary

Winning teams
2022: Germany: Tom Haberer, Finn Kölle, Carl Siemens, Korbinian Walther, Peer Wernicke, Tim Wiedemeyer
2021: Germany: Tiger Christensen, Tom Haberer, Finn Kölle, Carl Siemens, Peer Wernicke, Tim Wiedemeyer
2019: France: Claude Churchward, Quentin Debove, Charles Larcelet, Nicolas Muller, Nathan Trey, Tom Vaillant
2018: Spain: Alejandro Aguilera, Gonzalo Leal, Jon López-Lanchares, Eugenio Chacarra, David Puig, Eduard Rousaud
2017: Denmark: Oliver Hundebøll, Nicolai Højgaard, Rasmus Højgaard, Frederick Korsgaard-Sejr, Kristoffer Max, Rasmus Neergaard-Petersen, 
2016: France: Edgar Catherine, Alexandre Fuchs, Jeong Weon Ko, Paul Margolis, Adrien Pendaries, Pierre Pineau
2015: Germany: Raphael Geissler, Michael Hirmer, Marc Hammer, Thomas Rosenmϋller, Maximillian Schmitt, Yannick Schϋtz
2014: Italy: Eduardo Raffaele Lipparelli, Stefano Mazzoli, Guido Migliozzi, Renato Paratore, Teodoro Soldati, Federico Zuckermann
2013: France: Paul Elissalde, Joris Etlin, Romain Langasque, Nicolas Manifacier, Pierre Mazier, Victor Veyret
2012: Sweden: Hampus Bergman, Tobias Edén, Marcus Gran, Hannes Rönneblad, Adam Ström, Victor Tärnström
2011: Spain:  Pep Anglès, Adri Arnaus, Mario Galiano, David Morago, Jon Rahm, Javier Sainz
2010: Belgium: Thomas Detry, Gregory Mertens, Dewi Merckx, Bertrand Mommaerts, Thomas Pieters, Cedric Van Wassenhove
2009: Denmark: Mathias Becker Ive, Lucas Bjerregaard, Frederik Hammer, Mads Søgaard, Kasper Sørensen, Thomas Sørensen
2008: Sweden: Eric Blom, Niclas Carlsson, Pontus Gad, Daniel Jennevret, Mattias Nordsqvist, Sebastian Söderberg
2007: Denmark: Nicolai Aagaard, Lucas Bjerregaard, Daniel Løkke, Nicklaez Rasmussen, Kasper Sørensen, Patrick Winter
2006: Norway: Are Friestad, Daniel Bo Jacobsen, Fredrik Kollevold, Anders B Kristiansen,  Joakim Mikkelsen, Marius Thorp
2005: Netherlands: Tristan Bierenbroospot, Bernard Geelkerken, Floris de Haas, Reinier Saxton, Tim Sluiter, Floris de Vries
2004: England: Lawrence Allen, Matthew Baldwin, Ben Evans, Oliver Fisher, Ben Parker, John Parry
2003: Italy: Alberto Campanile, Federico Colombo, Matteo Delpodio, Lorenzo Gagli, Antonio Garbaccio, Marco Gueisoli
2002: Spain:  Rafa Cabrera-Bello, Jorge Campillo, Fernando García Grout, Pablo Martin, Carlos del Moral, Gonzalo Vicente
2001: Sweden: Gustav Adell, Johannes Andersson, Jonas Blixt, Steven Jeppesen, Niklas Lemke, Robert Svensson
2000: Scotland: Stephen Buckley, Jack Doherty, David Inglis, Martin Laird, Kevin Reid, Mark Risbridger
1999: England: Nick Dougherty, Scott Godfrey, Sandeep Grewal, David Porter, Simon Robinson, Ben Welch
1998: Ireland: David Jones, Justin Kehoe, Michael McDermot, Sean McTernan, Meavyn Owens, Robin Symes
1997: Spain: Sergio Garcia, David James, Alvaro Mata, Raul Quiros, Angel Luis Saura, Rafael Vera
1996: Spain: Inaki Alustiza, Gonzalo Fernández-Castaño, Sergio Garcia, Alvaro Mata, Raul Quiros, Rafael Vera
1995: England: Robert Duck, Carl Duke, Luke Donald, Jamie Little, Denny Lucas, John Wells
1994: England: Carl Duke, Max Harris, Jamie Little, Rodgers, Steve Webster
1993: Sweden: Johan Axgren, Kalle Brink, Johan Edfors, Viktor Gustavsson, Henrik Ingemarsson, Daniel Olsson
1992: Scotland: Andrew Farmer,  Stephen Gallacher, Hugh McKibben, David Orr, Alan Reid,  Gordon Sherry 
1991: Sweden: Chris Hanell, Claes Hovstadius, Mikael Lundberg, Mikael Persson, Johan Sehlberg och Leif Westerberg
1990: Spain: C. Beautell, P. Beautell, Diego Borrego, F. De Pablo, Ignacio Garrido, F. Valera 
1989: England: Bathgate, Ian Garbutt, Page, Michael Smith, Walker
1988: France: Jean Charles Cambon, Christian Cévaër, Patrice Barquez, Olivier Edmond, Christophe Muniesa
1987: Scotland: Stuart Bannerman, Andrew Coltart, Stephen Docherty, Neil Duncan, Euan McIntosh, Alan Tait 
1986: England: James Bennett, James Cook, Steven Edlgley, Wayne Henry, Glen Kemble 
1985: England: Peter Baker, James Cook, Patrick Hall, Wayne Henry, Jonathan Langemead, Paul Sweetsur 
1984: Scotland: Mark Brennan, Kenny Buchan, Calum Innes, Lee Vannet, Allan Turnbull
1983: Sweden: Håkan Eriksson, Per-Ulrik Johansson, Mikael Krantz, Fredrik Lindgren, Thomas Svanstedt 
1982: Italy: Emanuele Bolognesi, Alberto Binaghi, Luigi Figari, Silvio Grappasoni, Giorgio Merletti

See also
 European Girls' Team Championship  – amateur team golf championship for women up to 18 organized by the European Golf Association
European Youths' Team Championship – discontinued amateur team golf championship for men under 22 played 1968-2006 organized by the European Golf Association

References

External links
European Golf Association: Full results

Amateur golf tournaments
Junior golf tournaments
Team golf tournaments
Recurring sporting events established in 1980